Phyllis Thede (born February 23, 1954) is an American politician, representing the 93rd District in the Iowa House of Representatives as a member of the Iowa Democratic Party. With a background in community education and unions, she was first elected in 2009. She is married and the mother of Robin Thede, a nationally known comedic actress and writer, and two other daughters.

, Thede serves on several committees in the Iowa House - the Ethics, Local Government, and Natural Resources committees.  She also serves as the ranking member of the Environmental Protection committee and as a member of the Health and Human Services Appropriations Subcommittee and of the Human Rights Board.

Early life and education
Phyllis Thede was born in 1954 to an African-American family in Chicago, Illinois. Her family moved there from the Deep South in the Great Migration of the early 20th century. Her family later moved to Creston, Iowa, in the southern part of the state, where her father worked on the Burlington Northern Santa Fe (BNSF) railroad, which had established a major division center here, with machine shops and roundhouse.

Phyllis attended local schools and started her higher education at Southwestern Community College. There she met Dave Thede, whom she married in 1974. His family was German-American, with ancestors who immigrated to the US from the 1840s. They moved together to Le Mars, Iowa where they both attended Westmar College.

Work and family
In 1976 Dave graduated and started teaching, and Phyllis also started working in local schools. They had three daughters together, Robin Thede born in Spencer and two younger girls born in Davenport, Iowa, where they lived from 1980 to 2004. Today she and Dave live in Bettendorf and have several grandchildren.

Phyllis Thede has worked in a variety of administrative jobs in the schools, also becoming active in the union. She helped negotiate contracts and advised on grievances.

Electoral history
*incumbent

References

External links

 Representative Phyllis Thede official Iowa General Assembly site
Phyllis Thede State Representative official constituency site
 

Democratic Party members of the Iowa House of Representatives
Women state legislators in Iowa
African-American women in politics
Politicians from Chicago
People from Bettendorf, Iowa
Living people
Place of birth missing (living people)
1954 births
African-American state legislators in Iowa
21st-century American politicians
21st-century American women politicians
21st-century African-American women
21st-century African-American politicians
20th-century African-American people
20th-century African-American women